Mnasra is a small town and rural commune in Kénitra Province, Rabat-Salé-Kénitra, Morocco. At the time of the 2004 census, the commune had a total population of 29,354 people living in 4088 households.

References

Populated places in Kénitra Province
Rural communes of Rabat-Salé-Kénitra